Multidisciplinary Research focused on Parkinson's Disease, also known as MultiPark, is a strategic research area funded by the Swedish government, intending to improve life for people with Parkinson's disease.

The MultiPark programme ranges from pre-clinical research to studies on the everyday life situations of people with Parkinson's. Neuroscientists at MultiPark collaborate with researchers from chemistry, nanotechnology, physics and computer science. The programme aims to improve the patients' body functions but also their activity and participation. The initiative relies on interactions between Lund University and Skane University Hospital with support from the University of Gothenburg.

References

External links 
 The MultiPark Website
 The Swedish Research Council on MultiPark

Parkinson's disease